Darren Walsh may refer to:

 Darren Walsh (footballer) (born 1984), Australian rules footballer
 Darren Walsh (director), British director, animator and writer
 Darren Walsh (tennis) (born 1989), British tennis player